The year 1663 in music.

Opera
Antonio Cesti – La Dori Venice premiere
Kaspar Förster – Der lobwürdige Cadmus

Music 

 Johann Rudolf Ahle 
 Ach Herr, mich armen Sünder
 Neugepflantzten Thüringischen Lustgarten
Giovanni Arrigoni—Salmi, Op. 9
 Andreas Hammerschmidt—16 Masses
 Bonifazio Graziani—Responsoria hebdomadæ sanctæ, Op.9
Giovanni Legrenzi – Sonate a due, tre, cinque, a sei stromenti. Libro 3. Op. 8
Jean-Baptiste Lully—Les noces de Village, LWV 19
 John Playford -- Musick's Hand-maid
Johann Adam Reincken – An Wasserflüssen Babylon

Births
March 7 – Tomaso Antonio Vitali, violinist and composer (died 1745)
March 16 – Jean-Baptiste Matho, composer (died 1743)
July 1 – Franz Xaver Murschhauser, German composer and music theorist (died 1738)
September 25 – Johann Nikolaus Hanff, composer (died 1711)
November 14 – Friedrich Wilhelm Zachow, composer, teacher of Handel (died 1712)
date unknown
Andrea Adami da Bolsena, papal choirmaster (died 1742)
Nicolas Siret, organist, harpsichordist and composer (died 1754)
Johann Joseph Vilsmayr, composer (died 1722)

Deaths
March 20 – Biagio Marini, violinist and composer (born 1594)
July 2 – Thomas Selle, composer (born 1599)
July 24 – Thomas Baltzar, violinist (born c.1631)
December 5 – Severo Bonini, composer (born 1582)
date unknown
Antoine de Beaulieu, ballet dancer
Nicolas Hotman, composer (born c.1610)
Heinrich Scheidemann, organist and composer (born c.1595)

References 

 
Music
17th century in music
Music by year